The WAGR ASA class was a steam railcar operated between 1931 and about 1954 by the Western Australian Government Railways (WAGR).  In 1959, it was converted into track recording car ALT 88.  It was withdrawn from service in 1992 and sent to Boyanup Transport Museum for preservation.

References

Notes

Bibliography

External links

Steam railcars of Western Australia